Ginseng is the root of plants in the genus Panax, such as Korean ginseng (P. ginseng), South China ginseng (P. notoginseng), and American ginseng (P. quinquefolius), typically characterized by the presence of ginsenosides and gintonin. Ginseng is most commonly used in the cuisines and medicines of China and Korea.

Although ginseng has been used in traditional medicine over centuries, modern clinical research is inconclusive about its medical effectiveness. There is no substantial evidence that ginseng is effective for treating any medical condition and, in the United States, for example, its use has not been approved by the US Food and Drug Administration (FDA) as a prescription drug. Although ginseng is commonly sold as a dietary supplement, inconsistent manufacturing practices for supplements have led to analyses showing that ginseng products may be contaminated with toxic metals or unrelated filler compounds, and its excessive use may have adverse effects or untoward interactions with prescription drugs.

History 
One of the first written texts covering the use of ginseng as a medicinal herb was the Shen Nong Pharmacopoeia, written in China in 196 AD. In his Compendium of Materia Medica herbal of 1596, Li Shizhen described ginseng as a "superior tonic". However, the herb was not used as a "cure-all" medicine, but more specifically as a tonic for patients with chronic illnesses and those who were convalescing.

Control over ginseng fields in China and Korea became an issue in the 16th century.

Ginseng species 
Ginseng plants belong only to the genus Panax. Cultivated species include Panax ginseng (Korean ginseng), Panax notoginseng (South China ginseng), and Panax quinquefolius (American ginseng). Ginseng is found in cooler climates – Korean Peninsula, Northeast China, Russian Far East, Canada and the United States, although some species grow in warm regions – South China ginseng being native to Southwest China and Vietnam. Panax vietnamensis (Vietnamese ginseng) is the southernmost Panax species known.

Wild and cultivated ginseng

Wild ginseng 

Wild ginseng grows naturally in mountains and is hand-picked by gatherers known as simmani. The wild ginseng plant is now almost extinct in China and endangered globally. This is due to high demand for the product in recent years, leading to the harvesting of wild plants faster than they can grow and reproduce (a wild ginseng plant can take years to reach maturity). Wild ginseng can be processed to be red or white ginseng. Wild American ginseng has long been used by Native Americans for medicine. Since the mid-1700s, it has been harvested for international trade. Today wild American ginseng can be harvested in 19 states but has restrictions for exporting.

Cultivated ginseng 

Cultivated ginseng is less expensive than rarely available wild ginseng.

Cultivated ginseng is planted on mountains by humans and is allowed to grow like wild ginseng.

Ginseng processing 

Ginseng seed normally does not germinate until the second spring following the harvest of berries in the Autumn. They must first be subjected to a long period of storage in a moist medium with a warm/cold treatment, a process known as stratification.

Fresh ginseng 
Fresh ginseng, also called "green ginseng", is non-dried raw product. Its use is limited by availability.

White ginseng 

White ginseng is peeled and dried ginseng. White ginseng is fresh ginseng which has been dried without being heated. It is peeled and dried to reduce the water content to 12% or less. White ginseng air-dried in the sun may contain less of the therapeutic constituents. Enzymes contained in the root may break down these constituents in the process of drying. Drying in the sun bleaches the root to a yellowish-white color.

Red ginseng 
Red ginseng is steamed and dried ginseng, which has reddish color. Red ginseng is less vulnerable to decay than white ginseng. It is frequently marinated in an herbal brew which results in the root becoming extremely brittle.

Production 
Commercial ginseng is sold in over 35 countries, with China as the largest consumer. In 2013, global sales of ginseng exceeded $2 billion, of which half was produced by South Korea. In the early 21st century, 99% of the world's 80,000 tons of ginseng was produced in just four countries: China (44,749 tons), South Korea (27,480 tons), Canada (6,486 tons), and the United States (1,054 tons). All ginseng produced in South Korea is Korean ginseng (P. ginseng), while ginseng produced in China includes P. ginseng and South China ginseng (P. notoginseng). Ginseng produced in Canada and the United States is mostly American ginseng (P. quinquefolius).

Uses 
Ginseng may be included in energy drinks or herbal teas in small amounts or sold as a dietary supplement.

Food or beverage 
The root is most often available in dried form, either whole or sliced. Ginseng leaf, although not as highly prized, is sometimes also used.

In Korean cuisine, ginseng is used in various banchan (side dishes) and guk (soups), as well as tea and alcoholic beverages. Ginseng-infused tea and liquor, known as insam cha (literally "ginseng tea") and insam-ju ("ginseng liquor") is consumed.

Dietary supplement
Although ginseng is commonly sold as a dietary supplement, concerns have been raised about manufactured ginseng products containing toxic metals or filler materials, such as rice or wheat.

Traditional medicine and phytochemicals
 
Although ginseng has been used in traditional medicine for centuries, modern research is inconclusive about its biological effects. Preliminary clinical research indicates possible effects on memory, fatigue, menopause symptoms, and insulin response in people with mild diabetes. Out of 44 studies examined between 2005–2015, 29 showed positive, limited evidence, and 15 showed no effects. , there is insufficient evidence to indicate that ginseng has any health effects. A 2021 review indicated that ginseng had "only trivial effects on erectile function or satisfaction with intercourse compared to placebo".

Although the roots are used in traditional Chinese medicine, the leaves and stems contain larger quantities of the phytochemicals than the roots, and are easier to harvest. The constituents include steroid saponins known as ginsenosides, but the effects of these ginseng compounds have not been studied with high-quality clinical research as of 2021, and therefore remain unknown.

FDA warning letters
As of 2019, the United States FDA and Federal Trade Commission have issued numerous warning letters to manufacturers of ginseng dietary supplements for making false claims of health or anti-disease benefits, stating that the "products are not generally recognized as safe and effective for the referenced uses" and are illegal as unauthorized "new drugs" under federal law.

Safety and side effects 
Ginseng generally has a good safety profile and the incidence of adverse effects is minor when used over the short term. Concerns exist when ginseng is used chronically, potentially causing side effects such as headaches, insomnia, and digestive problems. 

The risk of interactions between ginseng and prescription medications is believed to be low, but ginseng may have adverse effects when used with the blood thinner warfarin. Ginseng also has adverse drug reactions with phenelzine, and a potential interaction has been reported with imatinib, resulting in hepatotoxicity, and with lamotrigine. Other side effects may include anxiety, insomnia, fluctuations in blood pressure, breast pain, vaginal bleeding, nausea, or diarrhea. If taken with other herbal supplements, ginseng may interact with them or with prescribed medicines or foods.

Overdose 
The common ginsengs (P. ginseng and P. quinquefolia) are generally considered to be relatively safe even in large amounts. One of the most common and characteristic symptoms of an acute overdose of P. ginseng is bleeding. Symptoms of mild overdose may include dry mouth and lips, excitation, fidgeting, irritability, tremor, palpitations, blurred vision, headache, insomnia, increased body temperature, increased blood pressure, edema, decreased appetite,  dizziness, itching, eczema, early morning diarrhea, bleeding, and fatigue.

Symptoms of severe overdose with P. ginseng may include nausea, vomiting, irritability, restlessness, urinary and bowel incontinence, fever, increased blood pressure, increased respiration, decreased sensitivity and reaction to light, decreased heart rate, cyanotic (blue) facial complexion, red facial complexion, seizures, convulsions, and delirium.

Terminology and etymology 
The English word "ginseng" comes from the Hokkien Chinese  (where this transliteration is in Pe̍h-ōe-jī). The first character  (pinyin rén;  or ) means "person" and the second character  means "plant root" in a forked shape.

The Korean loanword insam comes from the cultivated ginseng, which is less expensive than wild ginseng.

The botanical genus name Panax, meaning "all-healing" in Greek, shares the same origin as "panacea" and was applied to this genus because Carl Linnaeus was aware of its wide use in Chinese medicine as a muscle relaxant.

Other plants sometimes called ginseng 
True ginseng plants belong only to the genus Panax. Several other plants are sometimes referred to as ginseng, but they are from a different genus or even family. Siberian ginseng is in the same family, but not genus, as true ginseng. The active compounds in Siberian ginseng are eleutherosides, not ginsenosides. Instead of a fleshy root, Siberian ginseng has a woody root.
 Angelica sinensis (female ginseng, dong quai)
 Codonopsis pilosula (poor man's ginseng)
 Eleutherococcus senticosus (Siberian ginseng)
 Gynostemma pentaphyllum (five-leaf ginseng, jiaogulan)
 Lepidium meyenii (Peruvian ginseng, maca)
 Oplopanax horridus (Alaskan ginseng)
 Pfaffia paniculata (Brazilian ginseng, suma)
 Pseudostellaria heterophylla (Prince ginseng)
 Schisandra chinensis (five-flavoured berry)
 Withania somnifera (Indian ginseng, ashwagandha)
 Eurycoma longifolia (Malaysian ginseng, tongkat ali)

See also 

 Herbalism
 List of herbs with known adverse effects

References

Further reading
 Pritts, K.D. (2010). Ginseng: How to Find, Grow, and Use America´s Forest Gold. Stackpole Books.  
 David Taylor (2006). Ginseng, the Divine Root: The Curious History of the Plant That Captivated the World. Algonquin Books.  

Dietary supplements
Herbs
Medicinal plants of Asia
Non-timber forest products
Panax
Plant common names
Plants used in traditional Chinese medicine